Weicheng District is a district of Xianyang, Shaanxi, China.

The district is notable for a number of Zhou and Han era tombs.

History 
The Cheng state, which included northern portions of present-day Weicheng District, was settled by the descendants of  sometime between 16th and 14th centuries BCE. Present-day  was the site of a fief of the Cheng state.

The complex contains two ancestral halls dedicated to the kings, as well as over 40 steles, which were erected in their honor during the Song dynasty.

Administrative divisions
Weicheng District administers the following 10 subdistricts:

 
 
 
 
 
 
 
 
 
 

References

External links

County-level divisions of Shaanxi
Xianyang